National Tertiary Route 751, or just Route 751 (or ) is a National Road Route of Costa Rica, located in the Alajuela province.

Description
In Alajuela province the route covers San Carlos canton (Aguas Zarcas, Cutris districts).

References

Highways in Costa Rica